William Morris was a Scottish-U.S. soccer wing half who earned one cap with the U.S. national team.

Professional
Morris began his career with Ardeer Thistle of the Scottish Junior Football Association before moving to Hurlford United. In 1922, he signed with Kilmarnock of the Scottish Football League, though he played only two games before moving to Beith. In 1924, Morris moved to the United States where he signed with the Brooklyn Wanderers of the American Soccer League. In 1929, he began the season with Bridgeport Bears, but the Bears were sold a few games into the season and moved to Philadelphia. When that happened, Morris transferred to the New York Americans.

National team
Morris earned one cap with the U.S. national team in a 6–2 win over Canada on November 6, 1926.

See also
List of United States men's international soccer players born outside the United States

References

Scottish footballers
Ardeer Thistle F.C. players
Hurlford United F.C. players
Kilmarnock F.C. players
Beith F.C. players
United States men's international soccer players
Scottish Junior Football Association players
Scottish Football League players
American Soccer League (1921–1933) players
Brooklyn Wanderers players
Bridgeport Bears players
New York Americans (soccer) (1930–1933) players
Association football wing halves
American soccer players
Scottish expatriate sportspeople in the United States
Expatriate soccer players in the United States
Scottish expatriate footballers
Year of birth missing
Possibly living people